Ambatosola is a town and commune in Madagascar. It belongs to the district of Bekily, which is a part of Androy Region. The population of the commune was estimated to be approximately 8,000 in 2001 commune census.

The majority 83% of the population of the commune are farmers, while an additional 16.5% receives their livelihood from raising livestock. The most important crops are rice and peanuts; also cassava is an important agricultural product. Services provide employment for 0.5% of the population.

References and notes 

Populated places in Androy